Raúl Lavista (31 October 1913 – 19 October 1980) was a Mexican composer of film scores. Lavista worked prolifically during the Golden Age of Mexican cinema, and was credited on more than three hundred different productions. He is the father of the photographer Paulina Lavista.

Selected filmography 

 Judas (1936)
 Here's the Point (1940)
 The Count of Monte Cristo (1942)
 Another Dawn (1943)
 Divorced (1943)
 The White Monk (1945)
 Twilight (1945)
 Everybody's Woman (1946)
 Women in the Night (1948)
 Sofia (1948)
 Nocturne of Love (1948)
 Corner Stop (1948)
 Philip of Jesus (1949)
 A Family Like Many Others (1949)
 Zorina (1949)
 Confessions of a Taxi Driver (1949)
 Over the Waves (1950)
 Full Speed Ahead (1951)
 What Has That Woman Done to You? (1951)
 In the Palm of Your Hand (1951)
 Kill Me Because I'm Dying! (1951)
 Girls in Uniform (1951)
 Women's Prison (1951)
 Crime and Punishment (1951)
 The Night Falls (1952)
 If I Were a Congressman (1952)
 The Atomic Fireman (1952)
 The Photographer (1953)
 Women Who Work (1953)
 Tehuantepec (1954)
 The Price of Living (1954)
 A Life in the Balance (1955)
 Arm in Arm Down the Street (1956)
 Daniel Boone, Trail Blazer (1956)
 To Each His Life (1960)
 The She-Wolf (1965)
 Alma llanera (1965)
 The Incredible Professor Zovek (1972)

References

Bibliography

External links 
 

1913 births
1980 deaths
Mexican composers